Joseph Walter Price (born November 29, 1956), is a former Major League Baseball pitcher who played in the Major Leagues from 1980 to 1990. He played college baseball for Oklahoma State University from 1975 to 1976, and played for the University of Oklahoma in 1977. On June 7, 1977, Price was drafted by the Cincinnati Reds in the 4th round with the 102nd pick of the 1977 amateur draft. In 1978, Price was named the Pioneer League's MVP.

References

External links
  
Joe Price at Baseball Almanac

Major League Baseball pitchers
Cincinnati Reds players
San Francisco Giants players
Boston Red Sox players
Baltimore Orioles players
Nashville Sounds players
Tampa Tarpons (1957–1987) players
Baseball players from Inglewood, California
1956 births
Living people
Oklahoma State Cowboys baseball players
Oklahoma Sooners baseball players